Heliotaurus ruficollis is a species of comb-clawed beetle in the family Tenebrionidae, found in southern Europe and northern Africa. The beetles are generally black with a dark red thorax.

References

External links

 

Alleculinae
Taxa named by Johan Christian Fabricius
Beetles described in 1781
Beetles of North Africa
Beetles of Europe